BC Beroe is a Bulgarian professional basketball club based in Stara Zagora. The club plays its home games at the Municipal Hall. The club was founded in 1958 after a union between Botev and Lokomotiv sports clubs. In 2012, the team promoted to the NBL.

History

Beroe was founded in 1958 after the union between Botev and Lokomotiv sport clubs. In 1961, Beroe's men team earned the right to play in the already formed elite basketball A group of 8 Sofia and 8 provincial teams. After a period of several years in the Group B Beroe won back his place in the elite echelon - Group A 1971. In 2004, Beroe occupied ninth place in the league of the country with coach Konstantin Boev. In 2012, the team promoted to the NBL.

Honours
Bulgarian Cup
Champions (1): 2017

Bulgarian Basketball Super Cup
Champions (1): 2017

BIBL
Champions (1): 2017

Division A (II tier):
 Champions (1): 2012
 Runners-up  (2): 2011, 2010

Cup of BFB (II tier):
 Winners (1): 2012

Season by season

Current roster

Notable former players
Austin Price (born 1995), American

Head coaches
   Lubomir Minchev

External links
 Official website 
 Club Profile at bgbasket.com 
 Eurobasket.com BC Baroe Page

Basketball teams in Bulgaria
Sport in Stara Zagora